Claudio Golinelli (born 1 May 1962 in Piacenza) is an Italian former professional road and track cyclist.

Major results

Track

1985
 1st  Keirin, National Championships
 3rd  Sprint, European Championships
1986
 1st  Sprint, National Championships
 3rd  Sprint, European Championships
1987
 1st  Keirin, National Championships
 UCI World Championships
2nd  Keirin
3rd  Sprint
1988
 1st  Keirin, UCI World Championships
 National Championships
1st  Keirin
1st  Sprint
1989
 UCI World Championships
1st  Keirin
1st  Sprint
 1st  Sprint, National Championships
1990
 National Championships
1st  Keirin
1st  Sprint
 UCI World Championships
2nd  Sprint
3rd  Keirin
1991
 National Championships
1st  Keirin
1st  Sprint
 2nd  Keirin, UCI World Championships

Road

1983
 1st Gran Premio della Liberazione
1989
 1st Millemetri del Corso di Mestre
1990
 1st Prologue Settimana Internazionale Coppi e Bartali
1991
 2nd Millemetri del Corso di Mestre
1992
 1st Millemetri del Corso di Mestre

References

External links

1962 births
Living people
Italian male cyclists
Italian track cyclists
Sportspeople from Piacenza
Cyclists from Emilia-Romagna